Tetracha pseudofulgida is a species of tiger beetle that was described by Mandl in 1963, and is endemic to Goias, Brazil.

References

Beetles described in 1963
Endemic fauna of Brazil
Beetles of South America
Cicindelidae